The 19th century's version of the Baltimore Orioles were founded in 1882 as part of the new American Association. Owned by wealthy Harry Von der Horst, the Orioles finished the season in last place with only 19 wins.

Regular season

Season standings

Record vs. opponents

Roster

Player stats

Batting

Starters by position
Note: Pos = Position; G = Games played; AB = At bats; H = Hits; Avg. = Batting average; HR = Home runs

Other batters
Note: G = Games played; AB = At bats; H = Hits; Avg. = Batting average; HR = Home runs

Pitching

Starting pitchers
Note: G = Games pitched; IP = Innings pitched; W = Wins; L = Losses; ERA = Earned run average; SO = Strikeouts

Other pitchers
Note: G = Games pitched; IP = Innings pitched; W = Wins; L = Losses; ERA = Earned run average; SO = Strikeouts

Relief pitchers
Note: G = Games pitched; W = Wins; L = Losses; SV = Saves; ERA = Earned run average; SO = Strikeouts

External links
1882 Baltimore Orioles season at Baseball Reference
1882 Baltimore Orioles team page at www.baseball-almanac.com

Baltimore Orioles (1882–1899) seasons
Baltimore Orioles season
Baltimore Orioles